A grouper is a type of fish.

Grouper may also refer to:

 Grouper social club, a smartphone app between 2011 and 2016 that matched sets of three friends on group dates
 In Australia, 'Groupers' was an informal term for members of the Industrial Groups
 Grouper (musician), American musician
 Grouper, the former name of Crackle (streaming service)